Keldon Wilder Johnson (born October 11, 1999) is an American professional basketball player for the San Antonio Spurs of the National Basketball Association (NBA). He played college basketball for the Kentucky Wildcats. Johnson attended Oak Hill Academy in Mouth of Wilson, Virginia. In 2021, he won an Olympic gold medal in basketball as a member of the United States national team.

High school career
Johnson was rated as a five-star recruit and ranked as the 13th best player in the 2018 class by 247Sports.com. He committed to University of Kentucky to play college basketball, being joined by fellow recruits Immanuel Quickley, E. J. Montgomery, Ashton Hagans, and Tyler Herro.

College career
As a freshman, Johnson averaged 13.5 points and 5.9 rebounds per game, shooting 46.1 percent from the field and 38.1 percent from behind the arc. He scored 19 points in a win over top-ranked Tennessee on February 16, 2019. Johnson pulled down a career-high 17 rebounds in a victory over Auburn. Following the season he declared for the NBA draft.

Professional career

San Antonio Spurs (2019–present)
On June 20, 2019, Johnson was selected with the 29th overall by the San Antonio Spurs in the 2019 NBA draft. The Spurs obtained the draft pick used to draft Johnson in a 2018 trade; in that trade, Spurs small forward Kawhi Leonard was sent to the Toronto Raptors in exchange for Raptors shooting guard DeMar DeRozan, center Jakob Pöltl, and a draft choice. Johnson was later listed in the roster of San Antonio Spurs for 2019 NBA Summer League hosted at Vivint Arena. Johnson signed with the Spurs on July 1, 2019. On October 30, 2019, Johnson received his first assignment to the Austin Spurs, the Spurs’ affiliate team in the NBA G League.

Johnson made his NBA debut on November 22, 2019, playing two minutes in a 115–104 loss to the Philadelphia 76ers. On August 11, 2020, Johnson scored a season-high 24 points in a 123–105 win over the Houston Rockets with eleven rebounds and three assists.

On March 14, 2022, Johnson scored a career high 34 points along with 8 rebounds and 4 assists in a 149-139 loss against the Minnesota Timberwolves. On July 18, 2022, Johnson signed a four-year, $80 million rookie scale contract extension with the Spurs.

National team career 
Johnson had spent time as a member of the USA Select team and trained with the 2020 U.S. Olympic team. On July 16, 2021, Johnson and Denver Nuggets' center JaVale McGee were named to the Olympic roster in place of the injured Kevin Love and Bradley Beal, who was kept from traveling to Tokyo for health and safety protocols.

Personal life
Johnson majored in undeclared/exploratory studies in agriculture during his college time. Johnson's brother Kaleb also played college basketball, for Georgetown University during 2015-2019, and was drafted 34th overall by the Austin Spurs in the January 2021 NBA G League draft.

Career statistics

NBA

Regular season

|-
| style="text-align:left;"|
| style="text-align:left;"|San Antonio
| 17 || 1||17.7|| .596 || .591 || .795 || 3.4 || .9 || .8 || .1 || 9.1
|-
| style="text-align:left;"|
| style="text-align:left;"|San Antonio
| 69 || 67 || 28.5 || .479 || .331 || .740 || 6.0 || 1.8 || .6 || .3 || 12.8
|-
| style="text-align:left;"|
| style="text-align:left;"|San Antonio
| 75 || 75 || 31.9 || .466 || .398 || .756 || 6.1 || 2.1 || .7 || .2 || 17.0
|- class="sortbottom"
| style="text-align:center;" colspan="2"|Career
|161 || 142 || 29.0 || .478 || .385 || .753 || 5.8 || 1.8 || .7 || .2 || 14.4

College

|-
| style="text-align:left;"| 2018–19
| style="text-align:left;"| Kentucky
| 37 || 36 || 30.7 || .461 || .381 || .703 || 5.9 || 1.6 || .8 || .2 || 13.5

References

External links

Kentucky Wildcats bio

1999 births
Living people
21st-century African-American sportspeople
African-American basketball players
American men's basketball players
Austin Spurs players
Basketball players at the 2020 Summer Olympics
Basketball players from Virginia
Kentucky Wildcats men's basketball players
McDonald's High School All-Americans
Medalists at the 2020 Summer Olympics
Olympic gold medalists for the United States in basketball
People from South Hill, Virginia
San Antonio Spurs draft picks
San Antonio Spurs players
Small forwards
United States men's national basketball team players